Acromargarita is a genus of sea snails, marine gastropod mollusks in the subfamily Mitrinae of the family Mitridae.

Species
Species within the genus Acromargarita include:
 Acromargarita cappuccino S.-I Huang, 2021 
 Acromargarita cuyosae (Poppe, 2008)  
 Acromargarita deynzeri (Cernohorsky, 1980)
 Acromargarita kilburni (Poppe, Tagaro & R. Salisbury, 2009)
 Acromargarita musa S.-I Huang, 2021
 Acromargarita oliverai (Poppe, 2008)
 Acromargarita semperi (Poppe, Tagaro & R. Salisbury, 2009)
 Acromargarita yayanae (S.-I Huang, 2011)

References

 Huang, S.-I. (2021). A new genus Acromargarita n. gen. and four new Mitridae from the Indo-Pacific Ocean (Mollusca: Gastropoda). Visaya. 5(5): 79-94.

Acromargarita
Gastropod genera